Gladys Lengwe (born 6 February 1978) is an international football referee from Zambia. She was an official at the 2019 FIFA Women's World Cup in France.

References

Living people
1978 births
Zambian football referees
FIFA Women's World Cup referees
Women association football referees